Rogersville has a population of 7. Its elevation is 1,024 feet. Rogersville was established in January 1837 by James O. Rogers and John R. Colburn. The village is located a few miles from Blountsville, Indiana.

History
In 1851, it was documented that Rogersville had a post office with a postmaster named Jabesh Luellen. Luellen's tenure as postmaster appears to have been superseded by his son, David M. Luellen, who is listed as a postmaster of Rogersville in the book History of Henry County, Indiana. Luellen Jr. was also a merchant in the village.

In 1871, it was documented that Rogersville had a harness shop, a blacksmith shop, a shoe store, a grocery store and a dry goods store. In 1871, Rogersville also had a physician by the name of Dr. Kerr.

It has been stated that residents of the town were conductors on the Underground Railroad. Information at rootsweb.ancestry.com for the village states:

References

Further reading
  – Interview with Frank Luellen of Rogersville, Indiana

External links
 Rogersville Cemetery - Stoney Creek Township. Hcgs.net. – Information about Rogersville Cemetery, established in 1834

Unincorporated communities in Henry County, Indiana
Populated places on the Underground Railroad
Unincorporated communities in Indiana